Console Wars may refer to:

 Console war, a video game term referring to the competition for market dominance among console manufacturers
 Console Wars (book), a 2014 book
 Console Wars (film), a 2020 documentary based on the book